The Invisible Man is an animated series produced by MoonScoop Group, in co-production with BRB Internacional, Screen 21, Rai Fiction, and SMEC Media and Entertainment, and with the participation of M6, Disney Television France, Antena 3 and Eurocartoons. Each of the 26 episodes lasts 26–30 minutes. It was aired in Italy on Rai 2.

Plot
The story revolves around Alan Crystal, a genius but reckless teenager who is turned permanently invisible when an experiment goes awry. As with all good super-hero stories this one explores the issues related to leading a double life and keeping friends and secrets apart. He also finds himself a nemesis - Wallace Morton, a.k.a. Opacus.

Characters

Main Characters
 David Gasman as Alan Crystal/Invisible Man
 TBA as Foton 
 Mirabelle Kirkland as Linda
 Barbara Weber-Scaff as Gina
 Matthew Géczy as Monty Flips

Villains
 Paul Bandey as Wallace Morton/Opacus
 Allan Wenger as Iron King

Episode guide
A list of episodes

Regular episodes
 Episode 1  - Stolen Memory (by Régis Jaulie)
 Episode 2  - The Invisible Man vs. The Invisible Man (by Stéphane Carrié)
 Episode 3  - Ears Have Eyes (by Régis Jaulin)
 Episode 4  - A Mask for Two (by Thomas Barichella and Cyril Tysz)
 Episode 5  - My Over-Visible Friend (by Hervé Benedetti & Guillaume Enard)
 Episode 6  - Visible or Invisible
 Episode 7  - Wallace the Hero
 Episode 8  - One Surprise Too Many 
 Episode 9  - Out of Sight, Out of Mind 
 Episode 10 - Identified
 Episode 11 - TV Star Wars
 Episode 12 - Regression
 Episode 13 - High Tech
 Episode 14 - In the Clutches of the Black Dragon
 Episode 15 - In the Beginning
 Episode 16 - Black Light
 Episode 17 - The Man Who Disappeared
 Episode 18 - Emotional Intelligence
 Episode 19 - On the Docks (Part 1)
 Episode 20 - On the Docks (Part 2)
 Episode 21 - The Enemy Within
 Episode 22 - The Schblurb
 Episode 23 - The Last Temptation of Alan

Special episodes
 Episode 24 - Flower Power (Valentine's Day Special)
 Episode 25 - Halloween Express (Halloween Special)
 Episode 26 - Night of the Puppeteer (Christmas Special)

Duration
Each of the 26 episodes lasts 26–30 minutes.

Broadcast
It is currently being aired in the Italy On Rai 2. It is also being streamed on Tubi.

References

External links

 Official Website
 The Invisible Man on Taffy Live!
 Information File from bRb.es

2000s French animated television series
2005 French television series debuts
2000s Spanish animated television series
French children's animated adventure television series
French children's animated comic science fiction television series
French children's animated superhero television series
Italian children's animated adventure television series
Italian children's animated comic science fiction television series
Italian children's animated superhero television series
Spanish children's animated adventure television series
Spanish children's animated comic science fiction television series
Spanish children's animated superhero television series
Teen animated television series
Teen superhero television series
Fiction about invisibility